Miss America 2007, the 80th Miss America pageant, was held on the Las Vegas Strip in Paradise, Nevada on Monday, January 29, 2007, making it the first time that the pageant was held on a weekday, rather than the traditional Saturday since 1927's contest.

The pageant was broadcast live on CMT from the Theatre for the Performing Arts at the Aladdin Resort and Casino, only the second time that the pageant has been held outside Atlantic City.

At the conclusion of the final night of competition, outgoing titleholder Jennifer Berry crowned Lauren Nelson as her successor. Both titleholders are from Oklahoma, only the second occurrence of two consecutive winners from one state. The last time that two titleholders from the same state won in consecutive years was 1959 and 1960, when Mississippi did the honor.

Selection of contestants
One delegate from each state was chosen in state pageants held in mid-2006. Prior to competing in state pageants, the majority of delegates first were required to win a local title. Each delegates title is pre-dated to 2006, for example Melinda Toole is "Miss Alabama 2006" rather than "Miss Alabama 2007".

Many contestants competed in state pageants in both the Miss America and Miss USA systems numerous times before winning titles, and some had previously in other states to those which they won their state title.

All contestants were required to be between the ages of 17–24, unmarried and a citizen of the United States. They were also required to meet residency and education requirements.

Competition
All delegates compete in an interview competition with the judges, based on their platform issue, and also in the swimsuit, evening gown and talent competitions.

Prior to the nationally televised competition, the delegates participate in three nights of preliminary competition, where preliminary award winners are chosen in each category.

During the final telecast, following the announcement of the semi-finalists, the top ten compete in swimsuit and evening gown. The top five go on to compete in the talent competition, and the top three face a final interview round.

Results

Placements

Awards

Preliminary awards

Quality of Life awards

Other awards

Judges
The six judges for the competition were:
 Entertainer, Debbie Allen
 Photographer and television personality, Nigel Barker
 Actress and Miss Florida 1974, Delta Burke
 Musician, Michael Feinstein
 Television personality, Chris Matthews
 Television personality and Miss America 1981, Susan Powell

Contestants

1 Age as of January 2007

Crossovers
Unusually, no former Miss USA delegates competed in this pageant, although Sarah French, formerly Miss Arkansas Teen USA 2004 (and Miss Photogenic at Miss Teen USA) competed as Miss Missouri.
Later on Amanda Kozak, Miss Georgia won the Miss Georgia USA 2008 title and competed at Miss USA 2008.

References

External links
 Miss America official website

2007
2007 in the United States
2007 beauty pageants
2007 in Nevada
Zappos Theater
January 2007 events in the United States